The Last Witness is a 1980 South Korean mystery film directed by Lee Doo-yong, based on the 1974 novel of the same title by Kim Seong-jong. When the film was originally released, a 40-minute portion was cut due to censorship laws of that time. A remake with the same title was released in 2001.

Cast 
 Hah Myung-joong 
 Jeong Yun-hui 
 Choi Bool-am 
 Hyun Kill-soo 
 Han Hye-sook 
 Lee Dae-keun 
 Han So-ryong 
 Shin Woo-chul 
 Sin Dong-uk 
 Han Tae-il

References

External links 
 
 

1980 films
1980 crime drama films
South Korean crime drama films
South Korean mystery films
Films set in the 1950s
Films set in the 1960s
Films set in the 1970s
Films based on Korean novels
Films based on mystery novels
Films directed by Lee Doo-yong
1980s Korean-language films